Parliamentary elections were held in Greece on 17 November 1974. They were the first after the end of the military junta of 1967–1974, and took place during the metapolitefsi era. The winner was Konstantinos Karamanlis and his newly formed conservative party, New Democracy. Karamanlis had already formed a government of national unity just after the fall of the dictatorship. The second-largest party was the centrist Center Union – New Forces. The third party in the Parliament became the newly-formed PASOK, a radical socialist party led by Andreas Papandreou, son of the former Prime Minister Georgios Papandreou.

Results

Aftermath
These were the priorities of the Karamanlis's government:
The adoption of a new constitution
The abolition of the monarchy after a free referendum
The submission of a new application for Greece to join the European Community.

The new government decided on a referendum on retaining the republic, which was held on 8 December 1974.

In 1975 Konstantinos Tsatsos, a close friend of Karamanlis, was elected President of the Republic by parliament.

References

Further reading

Parliamentary elections in Greece
1970s in Greek politics
Greece
Legislative
Greece
Konstantinos Karamanlis